Tiberius Sempronius Gracchus ( 220 BC –  154 BC) was a Roman politician and general of the 2nd century BC. He served two consulships, one in 177 and one 163 BC, and was awarded two triumphs. He was also the father of the two famous Gracchi brothers: Tiberius and Gaius.

Tiberius was of plebeian status and was a member of the well-connected gens Sempronia, a family of ancient Rome. Tiberius was the son of Publius Sempronius Gracchus. He was nephew of the consul and general Tiberius Sempronius Gracchus (killed 212 BC). His paternal grandfather was also a consul in 238 BC.  His mother's identity is not known.

His father was not the same Publius Sempronius Gracchus who served as tribune of the plebs in 189 BC. Instead his father had possibly died during the Second Punic War, since no further references exist to him.

Early career 

Not much is known of his early life. He may have been made an augur in 204 BC in place of Marcus Pomponius Matho. He did, however, serve in the Roman army: while serving with the Scipios in Asia, he was sent as an envoy to Philip V of Macedon to negotiate safe passage to the Hellespont. 

He may have been sent a few years later, in 185 BC to adjudicate a dispute between Macedon and its Greek neighbours to the south over disputed territory. 

Tiberius served as tribune of the plebs in 184 BC (or possibly in 187 BC); he is recorded as having saved Scipio Africanus from prosecution and Lucius Cornelius Scipio Asiaticus from prison by interposing his veto. Tiberius was no friend nor political ally to Scipio, but felt that the general's services to Rome merited his release from the threat of trial.  Supposedly, in gratitude for this action, either Scipio or his son Publius Cornelius Scipio betrothed Scipio's youngest daughter to him.

However, accounts of this are mixed with similar accounts about the betrothal of the younger Tiberius Gracchus to his wife Claudia, so the facts are not certain. In both versions, the father hastens to make a betrothal to a Tiberius Sempronius Gracchus, without consulting the mother (his wife), to which the wife protests until she is informed that the bridegroom is Gracchus.

Since Scipio died in 184 BC or 183 BC and retired into the country well before then, and his youngest daughter Cornelia was only 6 or 7 at his death, it is more likely that the betrothal took place after Scipio's death, or that Tiberius was betrothed circa 186 BC to an older daughter who died before the marriage could take place. Plutarch's Life of Scipio has been lost, along with Scipio's own memoirs, and no contemporary histories or biographies of Scipio or Tiberius exist.

Military and political career 

Tiberius was elected praetor for 180 BC, a post that required men to be at least 40 years of age according to the cursus honorum, which brings estimates of his birth to around 220 BC.  Following his praetorship, he took up the governorship of Hispania Citerior in 179 BC after successfully objecting to his predecessor's attempt to have the army in Hispania recalled for a triumph on the grounds that the task was not yet done. He served there with the rank of propraetor from 179–178 BC. Rome had been fighting a prolonged and continuous conflict in Iberia since the mid-190s BC. While governor and in conjunction with the other Spanish governor, Lucius Postumius Albinus, he campaigned successfully against the Celtiberians, Lusitanians, and other hostile groups while negotiating treaties to ensure a prolonged peace. The agreements made mainly regularised tribute arrangements.

During his propraetorian governorship of Hispania citerior, he also founded the city of Gracchuris in 178 BC, on the river Ebro, becoming the first Roman to name a city after himself. During his campaigns, he claimed to have destroyed three hundred cities in Spain (almost certainly an exaggeration). Upon his return, the senate awarded him a triumph where he and his colleague Albinus presented some 60 thousand pounds of silver.

In 177 BC, he was elected consul with Gaius Claudius Pulcher. He was posted to Sardinia, where he suppressed a revolt assisted by propraetor Titus Aebutius Parrus. He waged two "ruthless" campaigns, fighting the Ilienses and the Balari, forcing their submission. At the close of 175 BC, he returned to Rome, claiming he had killed and captured some 80 thousand Sardinians, and triumphed for the second time in 175 BC.

He was elected censor starting in 169 BC with his former consular colleague Gaius Claudius Pulcher. The censors helped raise men for the war against Macedon, and was so strict that it provoked a prosecution of his colleague Claudius. Claudius was narrowly acquitted with Gracchus' help. Supposedly, during his censorship, citizens extinguished their lights when Gracchus passed at night from fear of being thought overly indulgent. While censor in 168 BC, he restricted the votes of freedmen by registering all of them into just one of the urban tribes over the objection of his colleague Claudius. He also had the basilica Sempronia constructed in the Roman forum; the request of theirs, however, to see the building programme to completion was vetoed.

After his censorship, in 165 BC, Gracchus was dispatched as head of an embassy to various eastern kingdoms on a mission to investigate the attitudes thereof to Rome, reporting that all had favourable views of the Romans.

In 163 BC, Tiberius was again elected consul. When performing the auspices when conducting the consular elections for 162 BC, he committed a procedural error: after observing a negative omen, he crossed the pomerium to consult the senate and therefore relinquished the auspicia militiae needed to hold the election. He discovered this procedural error after his successors had taken office and he had arrived in Sardinia for his promagistracy, whereon he reported it to the senate. The consuls were forced to resign, one of which was his brother-in-law Publius Cornelius Scipio Nasica Corculum, husband of his wife's elder sister.

Later life 

He returned to Rome late in 162 BC (the first year of his promagistracy) to become an ambassador to examine conditions in Greece and Asia, and to settle various disputes with neighbouring Hellenistic kingdoms.

It is not clear if the loss of Scipio Nasica's first consulship (he later served as consul in 155 BC) led to strain or dissension between the brothers-in-law (Nasica was elected censor in 159 BC and again consul in 155 BC); however, their sons fell out politically some thirty years later with fatal consequences.

Family 
Tiberius married the eighteen-year-old Cornelia in 172 BC when he was about 48 years old. Despite the age difference, the marriage was happy and fruitful. She had twelve children with him. Three children survived to adulthood: a daughter, Sempronia (who was betrothed to her mother's first cousin Scipio Aemilianus), Tiberius Gracchus, and Gaius Gracchus.

Tiberius is said to have loved his wife dearly (see anecdote below). Tiberius and other Romans also thought very highly of Cornelia as a wife and mother. When Tiberius died, Cornelia took charge of his property and the household. She refused to remarry, although she was offered marriage by several Roman senators and by the Egyptian king Ptolemy VIII; Cornelia devoted the rest of her life to the education and upbringing of her sons.

Plutarch's life of Tiberius Gracchus (son of this Tiberius) narrates that the father demonstrated his love for his much younger wife in an unusual manner: 

Tiberius's own life and achievement are obscured, however, by the reputation of his widow and the deeds of his two surviving sons. The elder son Tiberius would have been in his youth, while the younger son Gaius was a mere infant at his death. Both sons were apparently raised as much in the household of their kinsman and brother-in-law Scipio Aemilianus as in their own house and would have been influenced and educated by men such as the historian Polybius, the philosopher Panaetius, the satirist Lucilius, and the slave-turned-playwright Terence, as well as Scipio's own circle of friends from the Roman elite.

See also
 Sempronia gens
 Tiberius Gracchus, his elder son
 Gaius Gracchus, his younger son

Notes

References 

 
 
 
 
 
 
 
 

220s BC births
154 BC deaths
3rd-century BC Roman augurs
2nd-century BC diplomats
2nd-century BC Roman augurs
2nd-century BC Roman consuls
2nd-century BC Roman praetors
Ancient Roman politicians
Roman censors
Roman triumphators
Tribunes of the plebs
Gracchus, Tiberius 577 AUC
Year of birth uncertain